Fabrice Calligny (born 7 November 1981 in Fort de France) is a French sprinter who specializes in the 100 metres.

In the 4 x 100 metres relay event he won a silver medal at the 2000 World Junior Championships, a bronze medal at the 2006 European Championships and finished seventh at the 2006 World Cup.

He competed individually at the 2001 World Championships and at the 2002 European Championships without reaching the final round.

His personal best time is 10.22 seconds, achieved in July 2002 in Saint-Étienne.

References

1981 births
Living people
Sportspeople from Fort-de-France
French male sprinters
Martiniquais athletes
French people of Martiniquais descent
European Athletics Championships medalists